= Bark Camp Creek =

Stream in Georgia, U.S.

Coordinates: 32°48′53″N 82°08′52″W

Bark Camp Creek is a stream in the U.S. state of Georgia.

Bark Camp Creek was named for the "barkcamps" along its course, temporary settlements made with tree bark. Variant names are "Bark Camp Branch" and "Barkcamp Creek".
